Below is the list of populated places in Malatya Province, Turkey by the districts. In the following lists first place in each list is the administrative center of the district.

Malatya

 Malatya
 Alhanuşağı, Malatya
 Bağtepe, Malatya
 Beydağı, Malatya
 Bindal, Malatya
 Bulgurlu, Malatya
 Bulutlu, Malatya
 Çamurlu, Malatya
 Çolaklı, Malatya
 Dilek, Malatya
 Duranlar, Malatya
 Duruldu, Malatya
 Düzyol, Malatya
 Erenli, Malatya
 Fatih, Malatya
 Fırıncı, Malatya
 Göktarla, Malatya
 Göller, Malatya
 Gülümuşağı, Malatya
 Hacıhaliloğluçiftliği, Malatya
 Hacıyusuflar, Malatya
 Hanımınçiftliği, Malatya
 Hisartepe, Malatya
 Kamıştaş, Malatya
 Kapıkaya, Malatya
 Karagöz, Malatya
 Karahan, Malatya
 Karakaşçiftliğiköyü, Malatya
 Karaköy, Malatya
 Karatepe, Malatya
 Kendirli, Malatya
 Kırkpınar, Malatya
 Mahmutlu, Malatya
 Merdivenler, Malatya
 Orduzu, Malatya
 Özal, Malatya
 Pelitli, Malatya
 Samanköy, Malatya
 Sevildağ, Malatya
 Suluköy, Malatya
 Sütlüce, Malatya
 Şahnahan, Malatya
 Tanışık, Malatya
 Tepeköy, Malatya
 Tohma, Malatya
 Tokluca, Malatya
 Topraktepe, Malatya
 Topsöğüt, Malatya
 Uluköy, Malatya
 Üzümlü, Malatya
 Yaygın, Malatya
 Yenice, Malatya
 Yeniköy, Malatya

Akçadağ 

 Akçadağ
 Aksaray, Akçadağ
 Aksüt, Akçadağ
 Aliçeri, Akçadağ
 Altunlu, Akçadağ
 Aşağıörükçü, Akçadağ
 Aydınlar, Akçadağ
 Bağköy, Akçadağ
 Bahri, Akçadağ
 Bayramuşağı, Akçadağ
 Bekiruşağı, Akçadağ
 Bölüklü, Akçadağ
 Büyükçimiş, Akçadağ
 Büyükköy, Akçadağ
 Çakıllıpınar, Akçadağ
 Çatalbahçe, Akçadağ
 Çevirme, Akçadağ
 Çobanuşağı, Akçadağ
 Darıca, Akçadağ
 Dedeköy, Akçadağ
 Demirciler, Akçadağ
 Derinboğaz, Akçadağ
 Develi, Akçadağ
 Doğanlar, Akçadağ
 Doğantepe, Akçadağ
 Durulova, Akçadağ
 Dutlu, Akçadağ
 Dümüklü, Akçadağ
 Esenbey, Akçadağ
 Esenli, Akçadağ
 Fatih, Akçadağ
 Gölpınar, Akçadağ
 Güneşli, Akçadağ
 Gürkaynak, Akçadağ
 Güzyurdu, Akçadağ
 Hançerli, Akçadağ
 Harunuşağı, Akçadağ
 Ilıcak, Akçadağ
 İkinciler, Akçadağ
 Kadıibrahim, Akçadağ
 Kahyalı, Akçadağ
 Karamağara, Akçadağ
 Karapınar, Akçadağ
 Kasımuşağı, Akçadağ
 Kayadibi, Akçadağ
 Keklikpınarı, Akçadağ
 Keller, Akçadağ
 Kolköy, Akçadağ
 Kozalak, Akçadağ
 Kozluca, Akçadağ
 Kömekavak, Akçadağ
 Kurtuşağı, Akçadağ
 Küçükkürne, Akçadağ
 Levent, Akçadağ
 Mezra, Akçadağ
 Mihmanlı, Akçadağ
 Muratlı, Akçadağ
 Ortaköy, Akçadağ
 Ören, Akçadağ
 Resuluşağı, Akçadağ
 Sahilköy, Akçadağ
 Sakalıuzun, Akçadağ
 Sarıhacı, Akçadağ
 Şeyhler, Akçadağ
 Taşevler, Akçadağ
 Taşolar, Akçadağ
 Tataruşağı, Akçadağ
 Yağmurlu, Akçadağ
 Yalınbudak, Akçadağ
 Yalınkaya, Akçadağ
 Yaylımlı, Akçadağ
 Yukarıörükçü, Akçadağ

Arapgir 

 Arapgir
 Aktaş, Arapgir
 Alıçlı, Arapgir
 Boğazlı, Arapgir
 Bostancık, Arapgir
 Budak, Arapgir
 Çakırsu, Arapgir
 Çaybaşı, Arapgir
 Çiğnir, Arapgir
 Çimen, Arapgir
 Deregezen, Arapgir
 Düzce, Arapgir
 Eğnir, Arapgir
 Esikli, Arapgir
 Eskiarapgir, Arapgir
 Gebeli, Arapgir
 Gözeli, Arapgir
 Günyüzü, Arapgir
 Kayakesen, Arapgir
 Kaynak, Arapgir
 Kazanç, Arapgir
 Kılıçlı, Arapgir
 Konducak, Arapgir
 Koru, Arapgir
 Meşeli, Arapgir
 Onar, Arapgir
 Ormansırtı, Arapgir
 Pacalı, Arapgir
 Pirali, Arapgir
 Selamlı, Arapgir
 Sinikli, Arapgir
 Sipahiuşağı, Arapgir
 Suceyin, Arapgir
 Sugeçti, Arapgir
 Şağıluşağı, Arapgir
 Tarhan, Arapgir
 Taşdelen, Arapgir
 Taşdibek, Arapgir
 Ulaçlı, Arapgir
 Yaylacık, Arapgir
 Yazılı, Arapgir
 Yeşilyayla, Arapgir
 Yukarıyabanlı, Arapgir

Arguvan

 Arguvan
 Akören, Arguvan
 Alhasuşağı, Arguvan
 Armutlu, Arguvan
 Asar, Arguvan
 Asmaca, Arguvan
 Aşağısülmenli, Arguvan
 Bahçeli, Arguvan
 Bozan, Arguvan
 Bozburun, Arguvan
 Çakmak, Arguvan
 Çavuşköy, Arguvan
 Çayırlı, Arguvan
 Çevreli, Arguvan
 Çiftlik, Arguvan
 Çobandere, Arguvan
 Doydum, Arguvan
 Ermişli, Arguvan
 Eymir, Arguvan
 Göçeruşağı, Arguvan
 Gökağaç, Arguvan
 Gümüşlü, Arguvan
 Güngören, Arguvan
 Güveçli, Arguvan
 Hakverdi, Arguvan
 İçmece, Arguvan
 İsaköy, Arguvan
 Karababa, Arguvan
 Karahüyük, Arguvan
 Kışla, Arguvan
 Kızık, Arguvan
 Koçak, Arguvan
 Konakbaşı, Arguvan
 Koyuncu, Arguvan
 Kömürlük, Arguvan
 Kuruttaş, Arguvan
 Kuyudere, Arguvan
 Morhamam, Arguvan
 Tarlacık, Arguvan
 Tatkınık, Arguvan
 Yamaç, Arguvan
 Yazıbaşı, Arguvan
 Yeniköy, Arguvan
 Yenisu, Arguvan
 Yoncalı, Arguvan
 Yukarısülmenli, Arguvan
 Yürektaşı, Arguvan

Battalgazi

 Battalgazi
 Adagören, Battalgazi
 Ağılyazı, Battalgazi
 Alişar, Battalgazi
 Boran, Battalgazi
 Çolakoğlu, Battalgazi
 Hasırcılar, Battalgazi
 Hatunsuyu, Battalgazi
 Kadıçayırı, Battalgazi
 Kemerköprü, Battalgazi
 Kuluşağı, Battalgazi
 Meydancık, Battalgazi
 Şişman, Battalgazi
 Toygar, Battalgazi
 Yarımcahan, Battalgazi

Darende

 Darende
 Ağılbaşı, Darende
 Ağılyazı, Darende
 Akbaba, Darende
 Akçatoprak, Darende
 Akova, Darende
 Aşağıulupınar, Darende
 Ayvalı, Darende
 Balaban, Darende
 Barındır, Darende
 Başdirek, Darende
 Başkaya, Darende
 Çaybaşı, Darende
 Çınarköy, Darende
 Çukurkaya, Darende
 Gaziköy, Darende
 Gökçeören, Darende
 Göllüce, Darende
 Güdül, Darende
 Günerli, Darende
 Günpınar, Darende
 Hacolar, Darende
 Hisarcık, Darende
 Hisarkale, Darende
 Ilıca, Darende
 Irmaklı, Darende
 Karabacak, Darende
 Karabayır, Darende
 Karaoğuz, Darende
 Karşıyaka, Darende
 Kavakköy, Darende
 Kaynak, Darende
 Kerimli, Darende
 Körükler, Darende
 Kurudere, Darende
 Kuzpınar, Darende
 Mollauşağı, Darende
 Nurkuyusu, Darende
 Ozan, Darende
 Sakarya, Darende
 Şendere, Darende
 Şuğul, Darende
 Uzunhasan, Darende
 Üçpınar, Darende
 Yarımca, Darende
 Yavuzlar, Darende
 Yazıköy, Darende
 Yenice, Darende
 Yeniköy, Darende
 Yenipınar, Darende
 Yeşiltaş, Darende
 Yukarıulupınar, Darende

Doğanşehir

 Doğanşehir
 Altıntop, Doğanşehir
 Beğre, Doğanşehir
 Çavuşlu, Doğanşehir
 Çığlık, Doğanşehir
 Çömlekoba, Doğanşehir
 Dedeyazı, Doğanşehir
 Erkenek, Doğanşehir
 Eskiköy, Doğanşehir
 Fındık, Doğanşehir
 Gövdeli, Doğanşehir
 Günedoğru, Doğanşehir
 Gürobası, Doğanşehir
 Güzelköy, Doğanşehir
 Hudut, Doğanşehir
 Kadılı, Doğanşehir
 Kapıdere, Doğanşehir
 Karanlıkdere, Doğanşehir
 Karaterzi, Doğanşehir
 Kelhalil, Doğanşehir
 Kurucaova, Doğanşehir
 Küçüklü, Doğanşehir
 Örencik, Doğanşehir
 Polat, Doğanşehir
 Polatdere, Doğanşehir
 Reşadiye, Doğanşehir
 Savaklı, Doğanşehir
 Söğüt, Doğanşehir
 Suçatı, Doğanşehir
 Sürgü, Doğanşehir
 Şatıroba, Doğanşehir
 Topraktepe, Doğanşehir
 Yolkoru, Doğanşehir
 Yuvalı, Doğanşehir

Doğanyol

 Doğanyol
 Akkent, Doğanyol
 Behramlı, Doğanyol
 Burçköy, Doğanyol
 Damlı, Doğanyol
 Gevheruşağı, Doğanyol
 Gökçe, Doğanyol
 Gümüşsu, Doğanyol
 Koldere, Doğanyol
 Konurtay, Doğanyol
 Mezraa, Doğanyol
 Poyraz, Doğanyol
 Ulutaş, Doğanyol
 Yalınca, Doğanyol
 Yeşilköy, Doğanyol

Hekimhan
 Hekimhan
 Akmağara, Hekimhan
 Aksütlü, Hekimhan
 Aşağısazlıca, Hekimhan
 Bahçedamı, Hekimhan
 Ballıkaya, Hekimhan
 Basak, Hekimhan
 Başkavak, Hekimhan
 Başkınık, Hekimhan
 Beykent, Hekimhan
 Boğazgören, Hekimhan
 Çanakpınar, Hekimhan
 Çimenlik, Hekimhan
 Çulhalı, Hekimhan
 Davulgu, Hekimhan
 Delihasanyurdu, Hekimhan
 Dereköy, Hekimhan
 Deveci, Hekimhan
 Dikenli, Hekimhan
 Dikili, Hekimhan
 Dumlu, Hekimhan
 Dursunlu, Hekimhan
 Girmana, Hekimhan
 Güvenç, Hekimhan
 Güzelyayla, Hekimhan
 Güzelyurt, Hekimhan
 Hacılar, Hekimhan
 Hasançelebi, Hekimhan
 Haydaroğlu, Hekimhan
 Işıklı, Hekimhan
 İğdir, Hekimhan
 Karaköçek, Hekimhan
 Karapınar, Hekimhan
 Karslılar, Hekimhan
 Kavacık, Hekimhan
 Kocaözü, Hekimhan
 Kozdere, Hekimhan
 Köylüköyü, Hekimhan
 Kurşunlu, Hekimhan
 Mollaibrahim, Hekimhan
 Salıcık, Hekimhan
 Saraylı, Hekimhan
 Sarıkız, Hekimhan
 Sazlıca, Hekimhan
 Söğüt, Hekimhan
 Taşoluk, Hekimhan
 Uğurlu, Hekimhan
 Yağca, Hekimhan
 Yayladam, Hekimhan
 Yeşilkale, Hekimhan
 Yeşilköy, Hekimhan
 Yeşilpınar, Hekimhan
 Yukarıselimli, Hekimhan

Kale
Kale, Malatya
Akça, Kale
Akuşağı, Kale
Bentköy, Kale
Çanakçı, Kale
Darıpınar, Kale
Erdemli, Kale
Gülenköy, Kale
İkizpınar, Kale
Kaleköy, Kale
Karaağaç, Kale
Karahüseyin, Kale
Kıyıcak, Kale
Kozluk, Kale
Salkımlı, Kale
Sarıot, Kale
Tepebaşı, Kale
Uyanık, Kale
Uzunhüseyin, Kale
Yenidamlar, Kale

Kuluncak
 Kuluncuk
 Alvar, Kuluncak
 Aşağıselimli, Kuluncak
 Başören, Kuluncak
 Bıyıkboğazı, Kuluncak
 Bicir, Kuluncak
 Ciritbelen, Kuluncak
 Çayköy, Kuluncak
 Darılı, Kuluncak
 Göğebakan, Kuluncak
 İlisuluk, Kuluncak
 Karabük, Kuluncak
 Karaçayır, Kuluncak
 Karıncalık, Kuluncak
 Karlık, Kuluncak
 Kaynarca, Kuluncak
 Kızılhisar, Kuluncak
 Kızılmağara, Kuluncak
 Konaktepe, Kuluncak
 Kömüklü, Kuluncak
 Sofular, Kuluncak
 Sultanlı, Kuluncak
 Temüklü, Kuluncak

Pötürge

 Pötürge
 Aktarla, Pötürge
 Aliçeri, Pötürge
 Alihan, Pötürge
 Arınlı, Pötürge
 Arıtoprak, Pötürge
 Arslankent, Pötürge
 Bakımlı, Pötürge
 Balpınarı, Pötürge
 Başmezra, Pötürge
 Bayırköy, Pötürge
 Belenköy, Pötürge
 Bölükkaya, Pötürge
 Bölünmez, Pötürge
 Büyüköz, Pötürge
 Çamlıdere, Pötürge
 Çayköy, Pötürge
 Çengelli, Pötürge
 Çığırlı, Pötürge
 Çukuroymağı, Pötürge
 Deredüzü, Pötürge
 Düvenlik, Pötürge
 Erdemler, Pötürge
 Esencik, Pötürge
 Esenlik, Pötürge
 Gökçeli, Pötürge
 Gözlüce, Pötürge
 Gündeğer, Pötürge
 Gündüz, Pötürge
 Karakaya, Pötürge
 Karşıyaka, Pötürge
 Kavaklıdere, Pötürge
 Kayadere, Pötürge
 Koçköy, Pötürge
 Korucak, Pötürge
 Kozluk, Pötürge
 Köklükaya, Pötürge
 Kökpınar, Pötürge
 Körme, Pötürge
 Meşedibi, Pötürge
 Nohutlu, Pötürge
 Ormaniçi, Pötürge
 Örencik, Pötürge
 Örmeli, Pötürge
 Örnekköy, Pötürge
 Pazarcık, Pötürge
 Sahilköy, Pötürge
 Sorguçlu, Pötürge
 Söğütlü, Pötürge
 Taşmış, Pötürge
 Taştepe, Pötürge
 Tatlıcak, Pötürge
 Tekederesi, Pötürge
 Teluşağı, Pötürge
 Tepehan, Pötürge
 Tosunlu, Pötürge
 Ulutaş, Pötürge
 Uzunkoru, Pötürge
 Uzuntaş, Pötürge
 Üçyaka, Pötürge
 Yamaç, Pötürge
 Yandere, Pötürge
 Yazıca, Pötürge
 Yediyol, Pötürge
 Yeşildere, Pötürge

Yazıhan

 Yazıhan
 Akyazı, Yazıhan
 Alican, Yazıhan
 Ambarcık, Yazıhan
 Bahçelievler, Yazıhan
 Balaban, Yazıhan
 Bereketli, Yazıhan
 Boyaca, Yazıhan
 Boztepe, Yazıhan
 Böğürtlen, Yazıhan
 Buzluk, Yazıhan
 Çavuş, Yazıhan
 Çivril, Yazıhan
 Dedekargın, Yazıhan
 Durucasu, Yazıhan
 Eğribük, Yazıhan
 Epreme, Yazıhan
 Erecek, Yazıhan
 Fethiye, Yazıhan
 Gövük, Yazıhan
 Hamidiye, Yazıhan
 İriağaç, Yazıhan
 Karaca, Yazıhan
 Koşar, Yazıhan
 Kömüşhan, Yazıhan
 Mısırdere, Yazıhan
 Sadıklı, Yazıhan
 Sinanlı, Yazıhan
 Sürür, Yazıhan
 Tahtalı, Yazıhan
 Tecirli, Yazıhan

Yeşilyurt

 Yeşilyurt
 Aşağıköy, Yeşilyurt
 Atalar, Yeşilyurt
 Bostanbaşı, Yeşilyurt
 Cumhuriyet, Yeşilyurt
 Çayırköy, Yeşilyurt
 Görgü, Yeşilyurt
 Gözene, Yeşilyurt
 Gündüzbey, Yeşilyurt
 Işıklı, Yeşilyurt
 İkizce, Yeşilyurt
 Kadiruşağı, Yeşilyurt
 Kırlangıç, Yeşilyurt
 Kozluk, Yeşilyurt
 Kuşdoğan, Yeşilyurt
 Kuyulu, Yeşilyurt
 Oluklu, Yeşilyurt
 Ortaköy, Yeşilyurt
 Öncü, Yeşilyurt
 Salkonak, Yeşilyurt
 Seyituşağı, Yeşilyurt
 Üçgöze, Yeşilyurt
 Yakınca, Yeşilyurt
 Yalınkaya, Yeşilyurt

Recent development

According to Law act no 6360, all Turkish provinces with a population more than 750 000, were renamed as metropolitan municipality. All districts in those provinces became second level municipalities and all villages in those districts  were renamed as a neighborhoods . Thus the villages listed above are officially neighborhoods of Malatya.

References

Malatya Province
List